Nareewillock is a locality in the Lower Avoca ward of the local government area of the Shire of Buloke, Victoria, Australia.

The post office there opened as Narrewillock  on 1 November 1881, closed on 1 July 1895, reopened in 1902, closed on 1 December 1919, reopened again on 1 January 1921 and was closed on 30 June 1942.

References